East Bali Football Club Karangasem is an Indonesian professional football club based in Karangasem Regency, Bali. Club plays in Liga 3.

References

External links

Football clubs in Indonesia
Football clubs in Bali
Association football clubs established in 2021
2021 establishments in Indonesia